Amsden is an unincorporated community in Jackson Township, Seneca County, Ohio, United States. The community is served by the Fostoria (44830) post office.

History
Amsden had its start when the railroad was extended to that point. A post office called Amsden was established in 1874, and remained in operation until 2002.

References

Unincorporated communities in Ohio
Unincorporated communities in Seneca County, Ohio